

Day 1 (August 27)
 Schedule of Play
Seeds out:
 Men's singles:  Florian Mayer [22]
 Women's singles:  Sabine Lisicki [16],  Julia Görges [18],  Anabel Medina Garrigues [27]

Day 2 (August 28)
 Schedule of Play
Seeds out:
 Men's singles:  Juan Mónaco [10]
 Women's singles:  Caroline Wozniacki [8],  Christina McHale [21],  Francesca Schiavone [22],  Klára Zakopalová [24],  Monica Niculescu [26],  Tamira Paszek [29],  Peng Shuai [32]
 Men's doubles:  Max Mirnyi /  Daniel Nestor [1],  Mariusz Fyrstenberg /  Marcin Matkowski [4],  Michaël Llodra /  Nenad Zimonjić [7],  David Marrero /  Fernando Verdasco [13]

Day 3 (August 29)
 Schedule of Play
Seeds out:
 Men's singles:  Tommy Haas [21],  Andreas Seppi [26],  Mikhail Youzhny [28],  Viktor Troicki [29]
 Women's singles:  Anastasia Pavlyuchenkova [17],  Kim Clijsters [23],  Yanina Wickmayer [25]
 Men's doubles:  Mahesh Bhupathi /  Rohan Bopanna [8]

Day 4 (August 30)
 Schedule of Play
Seeds out:
 Men's singles:  Jo-Wilfried Tsonga [5],  Marcel Granollers [24]
 Women's doubles:  Katarina Srebotnik /  Zheng Jie [7]
 Mixed doubles:  Katarina Srebotnik /  Nenad Zimonjić [5]

Day 5 (August 31)
 Schedule of Play
Seeds out:
 Women's singles:  Li Na [9],  Lucie Šafářová [15],  Zheng Jie [28],  Varvara Lepchenko [31]
 Men's doubles:  Jonathan Marray /  Frederik Nielsen [11]
 Women's doubles:  Iveta Benešová /  Barbora Záhlavová-Strýcová [10],  Anastasia Rodionova /  Galina Voskoboeva [12],  Klaudia Jans-Ignacik /  Kristina Mladenovic [15]
 Mixed doubles:  Lisa Raymond /  Mike Bryan [2]

Day 6 (September 1)
 Schedule of Play
Seeds out:
 Men's singles:  Gilles Simon [16], Kei Nishikori [17],  Fernando Verdasco [25],  Sam Querrey [27],  Feliciano López [30],  Jérémy Chardy [32]
 Women's singles:  Dominika Cibulková [13],  Maria Kirilenko [14],  Jelena Janković [30]
 Men's doubles:  Jürgen Melzer /  Philipp Petzschner [10]

Day 7 (September 2)
 Schedule of Play
Seeds out:
 Men's singles:  John Isner [9],  Alexandr Dolgopolov [14],  Julien Benneteau [31]
 Women's singles:  Petra Kvitová [5],  Nadia Petrova [19]
 Men's doubles:  Robert Lindstedt /  Horia Tecău [3],  Colin Fleming /  Ross Hutchins [14]
 Women's doubles:  Liezel Huber /  Lisa Raymond [1],  Bethanie Mattek-Sands /  Sania Mirza [13],  Natalie Grandin /  Vladimíra Uhlířová [14]
 Mixed doubles:  Andrea Hlaváčková /  Mahesh Bhupathi [6] (walkover),  Klaudia Jans-Ignacik /  Mariusz Fyrstenberg [8]

Day 8 (September 3)
 Schedule of Play
Seeds out:
 Men's singles:  Nicolás Almagro [11],  Milos Raonic [15],  Mardy Fish [23] (walkover)
 Women's singles:  Agnieszka Radwańska [2],  Angelique Kerber [6]
 Men's doubles:  Ivan Dodig /  Marcelo Melo [12],  Santiago González /  Scott Lipsky [16]
 Women's doubles:  Vania King /  Yaroslava Shvedova [5],  Ekaterina Makarova /  Elena Vesnina [6],  Raquel Kops-Jones /  Abigail Spears [9]
 Mixed doubles:  Elena Vesnina /  Leander Paes [3]

Day 9 (September 4)
 Schedule of Play
Seeds out:
 Men's singles:  Richard Gasquet [13]
 Women's singles:  Samantha Stosur [7]
 Men's doubles:  Alexander Peya /  Bruno Soares [15]
 Women's doubles:  Julia Görges /  Květa Peschke [11]

Day 10 (September 5)
 Schedule of Play
Seeds out:
 Men's singles:  Roger Federer [1],  Marin Čilić [12],  Stan Wawrinka [18],  Philipp Kohlschreiber [19],  Andy Roddick [20]
 Women's singles:  Marion Bartoli [11],  Ana Ivanovic [12],  Roberta Vinci [20]
 Women's doubles:   Maria Kirilenko /  Nadia Petrova [4]
 Mixed doubles:   Liezel Huber /  Max Mirnyi [1],   Lucie Hradecká /  František Čermák [7]

Day 11 (September 6)
 Schedule of Play
Seeds out:
 Men's singles:  Janko Tipsarević [8],  Juan Martín del Potro [7]
 Men's doubles:   Marcel Granollers /  Marc López [6],  Aisam-ul-Haq Qureshi /  Jean-Julien Rojer [9]
 Women's doubles:   Nuria Llagostera Vives /  María José Martínez Sánchez [8],  Hsieh Su-wei /  Anabel Medina Garrigues [16]
 Mixed doubles:   Květa Peschke /  Marcin Matkowski [4]

Day 12 (September 7)
 Schedule of Play
Seeds out:
 Women's singles:  Maria Sharapova [3],  Sara Errani [10]
 Men's doubles:  Leander Paes [5] /  Radek Štěpánek [5]

Day 13 (September 8)
Only one completed match was done before the inclement weather, the men's singles semifinal match between David Ferrer versus Novak Djokovic and the women's singles final of Victoria Azarenka versus Serena Williams were scheduled to compete as play has been postponed to Day 14.
 Schedule of Play
Seeds out:
 Men's singles:  Tomáš Berdych [6]

Day 14 (September 9)

Women's singles final
The Women's single's final featured the then top ranked Victoria Azarenka against then three-time champion Serena Williams.  Williams had beaten Azarenka in the 2012 Wimbledon semifinals and had won her first six matches in the US Open easily without dropping a set.

Williams won the first set 6-2. Azarenka came back with a break in the first game of the second set and won 2-6. In the final set with the set tied 3-3, Williams double-faulted and Azarenka took advantage and won the break. At 3-5, Azarkenka was two points from victory against Williams' serve, and then at 4-5 Azarenka was serving for the match.  Azarenka then made three errors and lost the game to go to 5-5. Williams then won the final two games to win the title.
 Schedule of Play
Seeds out:
 Men's singles:  David Ferrer [4]
 Women's singles:  Victoria Azarenka [1]
 Women's doubles:  Andrea Hlaváčková [3] /  Lucie Hradecká [3]

Day 15 (September 10)

Men's singles final

The final featured defending champion Novak Djokovic and Andy Murray.  Murray won in 5 sets 7-6 (12-10) 7-5 2-6 3-6 6-2.  The match was noted for having several long rallies, with the longest being 54 strokes.     The match lasted 4 hours and 54 minutes which tied a record for a US Open final.  A tiebreaker of 22 points in the first set also set a tournament record.

Murray became the first British male to win a Grand Slam singles title since Fred Perry in 1936.
 Schedule of Play
Seeds out:
 Men's singles:  Novak Djokovic [2]

References

Day-by-day summaries
US Open (tennis) by year – Day-by-day summaries